James "Jems" Geffrard (born 26 August 1994) is a professional footballer. Born in Canada, he represents the Haiti national team.

Early life
Geffrard began playing futsal at age 12 and began playing football at age 14, where he played youth soccer with CS Rivière-des-Prairies, before later joining the Montreal Impact Academy.

Club career
Geffrard began his career in 2011 by signing with the Montreal Impact Academy, and competed in the Canadian Soccer League, and USL Premier Development League. In 2016, he signed with the Impact's second team, FC Montreal, in the United Soccer League. 

In 2017, Geffrard left Canada to play for Ekenäs IF in Finland's second division.

The following season he signed to play in the Veikkausliiga with Rovaniemen Palloseura. He joined on a one-year contract with an option for an additional season. He left the club after the 2018 season.

In 2019, he joined Fresno FC in the USL Championship. Geffrard made his debut for Fresno FC on 15 May 2019, in a U.S. Open Cup match against El Farolito Soccer Club.

Ahead of the 2020 season, he was set to attend training camp with the Montreal Impact, but ultimately did not attend. On 18 February 2020, Geffrard signed with Canadian Premier League side HFX Wanderers. His contract with the Halifax-based club expired after the 2021 season.  

For the 2022 season, he played in the Quebec-based Première ligue de soccer du Québec with CS Mont-Royal Outremont.

International career
Internationally, Geffrard represents the Haiti national team, and made his debut against Japan on 10 October 2017. In May 2019, he was named to the Haitian squad for the 2019 CONCACAF Gold Cup, serving as one of the team's best players, and helped Haiti upset his native Canada 3-2 in the quarter-finals. Geffrard also represented Haiti at the 2021 CONCACAF Gold Cup.

Honours
HFX Wanderers
 Canadian Premier League
Runners-up: 2020

References

External links

1994 births
Living people
Association football defenders
Haitian footballers
Canadian soccer players
Soccer players from Montreal
Canadian sportspeople of Haitian descent
Citizens of Haiti through descent
Haitian Quebecers
Black Canadian soccer players
Canadian expatriate soccer players
Montreal Impact U23 players
FC Montreal players
Ekenäs IF players
Rovaniemen Palloseura players
Fresno FC players
HFX Wanderers FC players
Canadian Soccer League (1998–present) players
USL League Two players
USL Championship players
Ykkönen players
Veikkausliiga players
Canadian Premier League players
Haiti international footballers
2019 CONCACAF Gold Cup players
2021 CONCACAF Gold Cup players
Haitian expatriate footballers
Expatriate footballers in Finland
Haitian expatriate sportspeople in Finland
Canadian expatriate sportspeople in Finland
Expatriate soccer players in the United States
Haitian expatriate sportspeople in the United States
Canadian expatriate sportspeople in the United States
CS Mont-Royal Outremont players
Première ligue de soccer du Québec players